Jeffery Lee Dangl (born October 13, 1957) is an American biologist. He is currently John N. Couch Professor of Biology at the University of North Carolina at Chapel Hill.

Education
Dangl earned his BAS of Biological Sciences and Modern Literature, MS of Biological Sciences, and Ph.D. degrees from Stanford University. He completed a postdoc at the Department of Biochemistry, Max-Planck-Institut für Züchtungsforschung in Köln, Germany.

Career
After time as a Group Leader in the Max-Delbrück Laboratorium at the Max-Planck-Institut für Züchtungsforschung, Dangl joined the faculty at the University of North Carolina, Chapel Hill, where he is currently the John N. Couch Professor of Biology.

Research

Dangl began his research career as an immunologist, studying mouse Ig heavy-chain genes.  Following his Ph.D., he moved to studying Arabidopsis as a model system for plant disease resistance research. Dangl has studied the genetic and molecular basis of plant disease susceptibility and resistance gene-for-gene relationship.  He, along with collaborator, Jonathan D. G. Jones, proposed the "zigzag model" for the co-evolution of plant resistance genes and pathogen effectors.

Dangl is an elected member of the U.S. National Academy of Sciences (2007), the Deutsche Academie der Naturforscher, The Leopoldina (2003), and the American Association for the Advancement of Science (2004). Jeff Dangl is the recipient of the 2009 Award from the International Society for Molecular Plant-Microbe Interactions (IS-MPMI).  The Board of Directors of the IS-MPMI noted that Dangl’s “seminal work in understanding the molecular basis of plant-pathogen interactions has made innumerable and invaluable contributions in elucidating the innate immune response in plants”. In 2009,  Dangl received the Stephen Hales Prize from the American Society of Plant Biologists.

He is a member of the editorial board of eight leading journals in genetics, genomics, and cell biology, he has served on several scientific advisory boards for companies, and he served administrative roles in several national and international societies relating to plant biology research.

Personal life
Dangl has a rare form of muscular dystrophy, facioscapulohumeral muscular dystrophy. 

Dangl is married to biologist Sarah Grant.

References

External links
 Dangl Lab Website 

1957 births
Members of the United States National Academy of Sciences
Living people
21st-century American biologists
Stanford University alumni
University of North Carolina at Chapel Hill faculty
Fellows of the American Academy of Microbiology
Scientists with disabilities